Kazimiera is a feminine form of the Polish name Kazimierz or Lithuanian Kazimieras (both mean Casimir) and may refer to:

Kazimiera Bujwidowa
Kazimiera Iłłakowiczówna
Kazimiera Kymantaitė
Kazimiera Rykowska
Kazimiera Strolienė
Kazimiera Szczuka (born 1966), Polish literary historian, literary critic and television personality
Kazimiera Utrata
Kazimiera Zawistowska (1870–1902), Polish poet and translator
Kazimiera Żuławska

See also

wikt:Appendix:Lithuanian given names
wikt:Appendix:Polish given names

Lithuanian feminine given names
Polish feminine given names